Shannon Saunders (born 12 October 1990) is a New Zealand netball player, who is currently contracted to the Southern Steel in the trans-Tasman ANZ Championship. Saunders, who is a predominantly a midcourter has played for Otago in the National Provincial Championships since 2010. She made the New Zealand under 21 squad in 2011 and played against Australia in three tests. 
She was later named in the FastNet Ferns squad to compete the World Netball Series, in Liverpool in late November. 
Saunders joined Silver Fern players Irene van Dyk, Maria Tutaia and Katrina Grant in the side.

She was named in the Silver Ferns for the Australian leg of the 2012 Quad Series, although she was not capped.

While playing international netball, Saunders completed a Bachelor of Pharmacy degree at the University of Otago graduating in 2012.

Shannon was also an exceptional sprinter while at school.

Netball career
Saunders started with the Southern Steel in 2012 as a midcourter and was captain in the 2021 ANZ Premiership season.  Saunders played her 150th game for Steel in the 2022 ANZ Premiership season, this marked only the third time a player had done this behind Casey Williams and Wendy Frew.

Personal life
Saunders was selected for the 2022 Commonwealth Games in Birmingham and  announced her pregnancy shortly after in August 2022.

References

1990 births
Living people
New Zealand netball players
Southern Steel players
ANZ Championship players
Commonwealth Games silver medallists for New Zealand
Netball players at the 2014 Commonwealth Games
Commonwealth Games medallists in netball
People educated at Motueka High School
Netball players at the 2018 Commonwealth Games
2019 Netball World Cup players
2015 Netball World Cup players
New Zealand international Fast5 players
New Zealand international netball players
Netball players at the 2022 Commonwealth Games
Medallists at the 2014 Commonwealth Games
Medallists at the 2022 Commonwealth Games